The Ryan and Amy Show is a Vancouver-based Canadian sketch comedy duo composed of Ryan Steele and Amy Goodmurphy. They have toured Canada and the United States including doing Sketch Fest in Montreal and Vancouver as well as Just For Laughs. The group produces sketch comedy shorts that are distributed via YouTube and on their website, but have appeared on other sites as well such as Funny or Die.  Goodmurphy and Steele have starred together in many television shows including the YTV show The Funny Pit with Roman Danylo, The Face of Furry Creek, CBC's The Pitch, and Out For Laughs. Steele made a memorable appearance on the second season of The Amazing Race Canada, coming in 3rd place with co-worker Rob Goddard. While Goodmurphy has been in Super Channel's Too Much Information with Geri Hall, Mark Forward and Lauren Ash, as well as Thirty Seventeen directed by Michael Coleman. The duo was short-listed for a Canadian Comedy Award in the Best Live Ensemble category in 2016. In early 2018 the duo's short film White Wine Boys Club won first prize at the Vancouver Just For Laughs Film Festival, as well as the Grand Prize competing Internationally against other JFL Film Festival winners. The Ryan and Amy Show have signed with Hadron Films to produce a 22 minute sketch comedy pilot, produced by Miles Forster & Chris Wilkinson.

Members

Ryan Steele
Ryan Steele grew up in the city of Langley, British Columbia, where he graduated from H. D. Stafford High School. He became interested in comedy at an early age, and started making comedy videos in his early-teens, with early successes 'Ferry Death' and 'Big Mac Attack'. After being diagnosed with testicular cancer at 19, he gave up the dream of being a comedian for a while. In his late 20s, he went to a Tony Robbins' like workshop where he was told to start doing Sketch Comedy, so he started his own ensemble sketch show.

Amy Goodmurphy
Amy Goodmurphy grew up in North Vancouver, British Columbia, and is a St. Thomas Aquinas Regional Secondary School alumna. She started comedy at the age of 23 after meeting Steele at the bar where he worked. He convinced her it would be worth her while to join his ensemble sketch show. It wasn't, so she started studying acting at Vancouver Acting School, graduating in 2012.

Kelowna Song
In May 2017 the duo had a viral hit about the town of Kelowna, racking up over 150,000 hits in under a month. Performing as Mom's over Miami, they sang 'My Sharona' by the Knack but with different lyrics.

References

External links
 
 
 

Living people
Canadian comedy duos
Improvisational theatre in Canada
YouTube channels
Year of birth missing (living people)